List of Superfund sites in Washington may refer to:

 List of Superfund sites in Washington (state)
 List of Superfund sites in Washington, D.C.